M1929 Telo mimetico (Italian: camouflage cloth) was a military camouflage pattern used by the Italian Army for shelter-halves (telo tenda) and later for uniforms for much of the 20th century. Being first issued in 1929 and only fully discontinued in the early 1990s, it has the distinction of being the first printed camouflage pattern for general issue, and the camouflage pattern in longest continuous use in the world.

History
Originally only printed on shelter halves, the pattern was not intended to be worn by soldiers though the shelter halves could be used as rain-ponchoes. From 1942, the printed fabric was also used for smocks for the Italian paratroopers. At some point before the outbreak of the Second World War, the pattern was changed, possibly to accommodate printing with smaller rolls. It was scaled down and compressed slightly lengthwise, but otherwise kept the shapes and colours of the first production. The pattern varied with time, the colours becoming brighter while the print became less crisp.

The pattern was continued into the 1990s, when it was replaced by a pattern based on US Woodland.

Distribution
In 1944, telo mimetico was adopted by the Germans and distributed to Waffen-SS units operating in Italy and Normandy during the spring and summer of 1944. Most frequently published photos show members of the 1st and 12th SS Panzer Divisions wearing the Italian attire along with a mix of standard issue Waffen-SS uniforms and equipment. After the Italian surrender, stocks of the Italian pattern were captured and used on other fronts. Some of it appears to have ended up in the hands of Czechoslovakian and Soviet units.

It is possible that the whole production machinery was moved by the Germans to Czechoslovakia, laying the foundation for the country's post-war production.

In art
The pattern also has the honour of having been deemed a work of art in itself. In 1966, the Italian artist Alighiero Boetti stretched sections of the fabric on frames under the title "Mimetico" (camouflage) as part of an exhibition on the Arte Povera  movement.

It was a challenge to the abstract tachist tradition of painting large, flat sections of colour.

References

External links

 The 1966 artwork "Mimetico" among other of Alighiero Boetti's works, also showing the repeats of the fabric.

Camouflage patterns
Military camouflage
Military equipment introduced in the 1920s